The South African Railways Class 19B 4-8-2 of 1930 was a steam locomotive.

In 1930, the South African Railways placed fourteen Class 19B steam locomotives with a 4-8-2 Mountain type wheel arrangement in service. One of them was later reboilered and reclassified to Class 19BR.

Manufacturer
Fourteen Class 19B 4-8-2 Mountain type steam locomotives were built in Germany by Berliner Maschinenbau AG and were delivered in 1930. All but one were built with Walschaerts valve gear.

Characteristics

The South African Class 19B, numbered in the range from 1401 to 1414, was a later model of the original Class 19 which had been designed in 1928 under the supervision of Colonel F.R. Collins DSO, Chief Mechanical Engineer (CME) of the SAR from 1922 to 1929. The longer wheelbase bogie also facilitated the removal of cylinder covers at running sheds. Because of this difference, the new engines were designated Class 19B.

The first thirteen Class 19B locomotives were delivered with Walschaerts valve gear, but like Class 16DA no. 879 of the same year, no. 1414 was equipped with Caprotti valve gear as an experiment. In January 1943, after thirteen years in service, the Caprotti rotary cam poppet valve gear was removed at the Uitenhage workshops and replaced with Walschaerts valve gear. The experiment did result in the successor Class 19C being built with rotary cam poppet valve gear.

The trailing bissel truck was constructed with three holes to enable the compensating beam to be fitted at three locations, which enabled it to be used to redistribute the engine's weight on the trailing axle. The axle load weights as shown for the Class 19B are with the trailing truck compensating beam pin in the rearmost of the three holes. The axle load weights as shown for the Class 19BR are also with the trailing truck compensating beam pin in the rearmost of the three holes.

A drawback of the Class 19B was that it was conservatively engineered with outdated short-travel valves which caused them to consume more coal for a given task than the later Class 19D.

Upon delivery, their new Type MT tenders were exchanged for the smaller modified Type MP1 tenders from some of the reboilered mainline locomotives. This policy was followed with all the Classes 19B, 19C and 19D locomotives except the last batch of Class 19D, which was delivered with Type MX torpedo tenders.

Watson Standard boilers
From the 1930s, many serving locomotives were reboilered with a standard boiler type designed by then CME A.G. Watson as part of his standardisation policy. Such Watson Standard reboilered locomotives were reclassified by adding an "R" suffix to their classification.

When Class 19B no. 1410 was reboilered with a Watson Standard no. 1A boiler, it therefore became the sole member of Class 19BR. It was not equipped with a Watson cab with its distinctive inclined front in the process, but retained its original vertical fronted cab. It did, however, have the tell-tale rectangular regulator cover just to the rear of the chimney which identified it as a Watson Standard reboilered locomotive.

Service

South African Railways
Some Class 19B locomotives served around Cape Town and between Kimberley and Vryburg, but most of them spent their working lives on the line between Graaff-Reinet and Rosmead across the Lootsberg Pass. A couple were also allocated to Sydenham in Port Elizabeth and occasionally worked on the Grahamstown branch.

This schedule only became possible after completion of the mile-long Carlton tunnel under the continental divide in mid-1958, which eliminated the long 1 in 40 (2½%) gradients up the old line to Carlton summit.

Since the Class 19B was heavy on coal, a ground-level concrete coal bin was built at Graaff-Reinet especially to replenish these locomotives on through runs while standing in the platform road. There was no standpipe alongside the platform road, however, so even though coal was taken here, through-working engines took water at Charlwood and Pretoriuskloof.

During 1974–1975 they were replaced by Class 19D locomotives on the Rosmead-Klipplaat section. By 1977, they were all withdrawn from service.

Industrial
After being retired from SAR service, several were sold into a second career in industrial service.
 No. 1402 went to New Largo Colliery in Transvaal and later to the Enyati Railway.
 Numbers 1407 and 1409 went to Lorraine Gold Mine in the Orange Free State.
 Numbers 1410 and 1411 went to the Free State Geduld Gold Mine as numbers 8 and 7 respectively. They later became Freegold North numbers 10 and 11.
 No. 1413 went to the Fluor for Sasol plant in Transvaal.

Preservation

Illustration
The main picture shows the Transnet National Collection's preserved Class 19B no. 1412 taking water at Blouwater before piloting a Class GMAM Garratt and the Union Express across the Lootsberg Pass, c. 2001. When withdrawn, no. 1412 was initially plinthed at Middelburg in the Cape Province and later restored. During 2016 it re-entered service as Bailey, restored at Voorbaai for the Ceres Rail Company.

References

2000
2000
2000
4-8-2 locomotives
2D1 locomotives
Berliner locomotives
Cape gauge railway locomotives
Railway locomotives introduced in 1930
1930 in South Africa